Alloclemensia americana is a moth of the family Incurvariidae. It is found in north-eastern North America.

References

Moths described in 1981
Incurvariidae